Durrus Road railway station was on the Cork and Bandon Railway in County Cork, Ireland.

History

The station opened on 4 July 1881.

Regular passenger services were withdrawn on 1 April 1961.

Routes

Further reading

References

Disused railway stations in County Cork
Railway stations opened in 1886
Railway stations closed in 1961